Cytohesin-3 is a protein that in humans is encoded by the CYTH3 gene.

This gene encodes a member of the cytohesin (CYTH) family, formerly known as the PSCD (pleckstrin homology, Sec7 and coiled-coil domains) family. Cytohesin family members have identical structural organization that consists of an N-terminal coiled-coil motif, a central Sec7 domain, and a C-terminal pleckstrin homology (PH) domain. The coiled-coil motif is involved in homodimerization, the Sec7 domain contains guanine-nucleotide exchange protein (GEP) activity, and the PH domain interacts with phospholipids and is responsible for association of CYTHs with membranes. Members of this family appear to mediate the regulation of protein sorting and membrane trafficking. This encoded protein is involved in the control of Golgi structure and function, and it may have a physiological role in regulating ADP-ribosylation factor protein 6 (ARF) functions, in addition to acting on ARF1.

References

Further reading